It's Not Easy Being Green is the fourth studio album by Filipino rock band Rivermaya. released on January 14, 1999.

The album features singles like "Nerbyoso" (Nervous), Rodeo, and Shattered Like. It is the first album after Bamboo Mañalac's departure. This is also their first album with Rico Blanco as the lead vocalist. It is also the last album they recorded for BMG Records Pilipinas. The album hits Gold barely a month after the album was released.

Commercial performance 
The album sold 40,000 units in the Philippines, making this the band's lowest selling album thus far and reached platinum certification status.

Critical reception 

David Gonzales of allMusic reviewed album and noticed some Brit-pop influences in "(A Little) Sorry (Should Make Everything Alright)" and "Shattered Like". He critiqued about Rico's performance as vocalist on the album. He stated "...While Blanco is a fine singer, it's possible that the loss of the charismatic Bamboo has shaken the band's confidence."

Track listing 
All songs by Rico Blanco except where noted.

Personnel
 Rico Blanco – lead vocals, guitars, keyboards, synths
 Nathan Azarcon – bass guitar, vocals, lead vocals (tracks 4, 10, 12)
 Mark Escueta – drums & percussion, vocals

Album credits 
Executive Producer for Rana Entertainment, Inc.: Chito Roño & Lizza G. Nakpil
Executive Producers for BMG Records Pilipinas: Rudy Y. Tee
A & R Direction: Vic Valenciano & Rommel Sanchez
Album Photography: Eddie Boy Escudero & Eric Liongoren
Digital Photography: Mark Escueta, Rico Blanco & Ryan Peralta
Package Concept & Design: Mark Escueta & Rico Blanco
Technical Assistant & Additional Layout: John Joel Lopez
Recorded At: Pink Noise & TRACKS Studios
Sound Engineer: Jun Reyes (Pink Noise) & Angee Rozul (TRACKS Studios)
Album Mix: Angee Rozul & Rivermaya
Horn Arrangements on "May Kasalanan" and "Bagong Taon": Mel Villena
Horn Section: JD Villanueva (baritone sax & bass clarinet), Ernesto Abarillo & Glenn Joel Lucero (trumpets), Ronnie Marqueses (trombone) & Dix Lucero (clarinet & alto sax)

Accolades

References 

Rivermaya albums
1999 albums
Tagalog-language albums